Hakea nitida, commonly called the frog hakea or shining hakea, is a shrub of the family  Proteaceae and is endemic to an area in the southern Wheatbelt, Great Southern and Goldfields-Esperance  regions of Western Australia.

Description
It blooms from July to September and produces white-cream and yellow flowers.
The plant has glabrous branchlets that are not glaucous. The flat rigid leaves are subpetiolate with a narrowly elliptic to obovate shape.
Inflorescences are axillary or terminal on short shoots with 16 to 36 flowers. Seeds are narrowly obovate with wings broadly down one side of seed body, narrowly down the other. The seed pods resemble warty toads or frogs giving the plant the unusual common name, the frog hakea.

Taxonomy and naming
The species was first formally described by Robert Brown in 1810 and the description was published in Transactions of the Linnean Society of London. The specific epithet (nitidus) is a Latin word meaning "bright", "shining" or "elegant", referring to the usually glossy leaf.

Distribution and habitat
Frog hakea grows in southern Western Australia from Busselton to Eucla on sandy-loam, clay and gravel in mallee or heath. An ornamental shrub, a good habitat plant for wildlife.

Conservation status
Hakea nitida is classified as not threatened by the Western Australian Government.

Gallery

References

nitida
Eudicots of Western Australia
Taxa named by Robert Brown (botanist, born 1773)
Plants described in 1810